Lakhsh District (before 2016: Jirgatol District) is a district in Tajikistan. It lies in the extreme north-east corner of the Districts of Republican Subordination. Its northern boundary is the international boundary with Kyrgyzstan; on the south it borders with Sangvor and Tojikobod districts, and its western border is with Rasht District. Its capital is the town Vahdat (formerly: Jirgatol). The population of Lakhsh district is 64,400 (1 January 2020 estimate).

Administrative divisions
They are as follows:

References

Districts of Tajikistan